Alyson Lewis (formerly Huber, born March 1, 1972) is an American politician who served in the California State Assembly from 2008–2012. She is currently a judge of the Superior Court of Sacramento County in California for a term that expires in January 2027. She is a Democrat.

Career

Political
In 2008 Lewis ran for the California State Assembly to represent the 10th district. She ran under her married name, Huber. For over three weeks after the November general election, Lewis was behind in the vote count; however, after provisional ballots from Sacramento County were counted, she was declared the winner on November 26, 2008. The final count showed she had defeated Jack Sieglock, a Republican and a San Joaquin County Supervisor, by 474 votes.  Sieglock had already attended the orientation for new Assembly members when he learned he hadn't won.

In 2010, Sieglock unsuccessfully challenged Lewis, who again ran under her married name Huber, for the same seat. Lewis won the election with 52.0% of the vote, with Sieglock garnering only 42.7%.

Although she had initially planned on seeking reelection in 2012, Lewis ultimately declined to run due to her pending divorce and the redrawing of her district lines.

Legal
On December 27, 2012, Lewis was appointed by Governor Jerry Brown to serve as a judge on the Sacramento Superior Court.

Education
Lewis graduated from Lodi High School in Lodi, California.

She started her college career at San Joaquin Delta College in Stockton, transferring to California State University, Chico and then to Cornell University in Ithaca, New York, where she received her undergraduate degree.

Lewis received her Juris Doctor degree from the University of California, Hastings College of the Law, San Francisco.

Personal
Lewis was married to Tim Huber. The couple has two sons: Riley, born circa 2003, and Colin, born circa 2005. She separated from Tim in January 2011 and filed for divorce in May. While she was married to Huber, Lewis was step-mother to Tim's two children from previous relationship.

Awards and honors
Lewis was named 2010's "Legislator of the Year" by the California Small Business Association. In 2009, the California State Sheriff's Association recognized her as an "Outstanding Legislator".

References

External links
Join California Alyson Huber

San Joaquin Delta College alumni
California State University, Chico alumni
University of California, Hastings College of the Law alumni
1972 births
Living people
California lawyers
Cornell University alumni
Democratic Party members of the California State Assembly
People from Fremont, California
People from Lodi, California
Women state legislators in California
American women lawyers
People from Sacramento, California
21st-century American politicians
21st-century American women politicians
Lodi High School (California) alumni
California state court judges